i is the seventh studio album by American indie pop band The Magnetic Fields. It was released on May 4, 2004, by record label Nonesuch. The songs of the album all start with the letter "i" and are all sung by Stephin Merritt. The songs are also in alphabetical order.

Musical style 

The album ditches many of Stephin Merritt's past synthpop and electropop influences, largely being led by guitars and strings. It was followed in 2008, by Distortion, and in 2010, by Realism, which were both also free of synthesizer instrumentation, forming the so-called "no-synth trilogy".

Album cover 

The cover art, designed by Evan Gaffney, is based on Gravity in Four Directions by Fred Tomaselli.

Reception 

i has been well received by critics. It currently holds a score of 79/100 on review aggregator website Metacritic.  A track-by-track tribute to the album, entitled ¡AYE!, was released by Jackson & the Wargonauts in 2014.

Track listing

Personnel 

 The Magnetic Fields

 Stephin Merritt – vocals, instrumentation, production
 Claudia Gonson – drums and percussion, piano, harpsichord, background vocals, arrangement on "In an Operetta"
 Sam Davol – cello
 John Woo – banjo, guitar, electric sitar

 Technical

 Charles Newman – recording
 Ravi Krishnaswami – recording
 Charles Newman – additional production, mixing
 Jeff Lipton – mastering
 Vincent Giangola – additional editing on "I Don't Believe You"
 David Merrill – recording on "In an Operetta"

References

External links 

 

2004 albums
The Magnetic Fields albums
Concept albums
Nonesuch Records albums